Woolwich East was a parliamentary constituency represented in the House of Commons of the Parliament of the United Kingdom from 1918 until 1983. Its seat was Woolwich, now in the Royal Borough of Greenwich in south-east London.

The constituency was formed for the 1918 general election, when the constituency of Woolwich was divided into Woolwich East and Woolwich West, and abolished in 1983 when it was largely replaced by a new Woolwich constituency. Between 1950 and 1974 it included North Woolwich on the north bank of the River Thames; this was then transferred to Newham South.

Throughout its 65-year existence, the constituency elected Labour MPs with the sole exception of a Conservative elected in a 1921 by-election.

Boundaries
1918–1950: The Metropolitan Borough of Woolwich wards of Burrage, Central, Glyndon, St Margaret's, and St Nicholas.

1950–1955: The Metropolitan Borough of Woolwich wards of Abbey Wood, Burrage, Central, Dockyard, Glyndon, River, St Margaret's, St Mary's, and St Nicholas.

1955–1974: The Metropolitan Borough of Woolwich wards of Abbey Wood, Burrage, Central, Glyndon, River, St Margaret's, St Mary's, St Nicholas, Slade, and Winn's Common.

1974–1983: The London Borough of Greenwich wards of Abbey Wood, Eynsham, St Margaret's, St Mary's, St Nicholas, Slade, and Woolwich.

Members of Parliament

Election results

Elections in the 1910s

Elections in the 1920s

Elections in the 1930s

Elections in the 1940s

Elections in the 1950s

Elections in the 1960s

Elections in the 1970s

References 

Craig, F. W. S. (1983). British parliamentary election results 1918-1949 (3 ed.). Chichester: Parliamentary Research Services. .

Parliamentary constituencies in London (historic)
Constituencies of the Parliament of the United Kingdom established in 1918
History of the Royal Borough of Greenwich
Politics of the Royal Borough of Greenwich
Woolwich